Elena Passarello is an American writer, actor, and professor. In 2018, she became the announcer for the PRI variety show and podcast Live Wire with Luke Burbank.

Career 
Originally from Charleston, South Carolina, Passarello studied nonfiction at the University of Pittsburgh and The Nonfiction Writing Program at the University of Iowa. Her essays have been published in newspapers including The New York Times  and national literary journals such as Virginia Quarterly Review, Gulf Coast, Slate, Iowa Review, and Oxford American. She is the recipient of a 2015 Whiting Award in nonfiction.

Her first essay collection, Let Me Clear My Throat, was published by Sarabande in 2012 and received the gold medal for nonfiction at the 2013 Independent Publisher Book Awards. In the book, Passarello writes about famous voices from cultural history, including the eighteenth-century castrato Farinelli, punk rock crows, impressionists, the rebel yell, the Wilhelm Scream, the Howard "Dean Scream," Pittsburgh sportscaster Myron Cope's "Yoy!", and Marlon Brando's "Stella!" from A Streetcar Named Desire. Passarello was the first woman to win the Stella Screaming Contest in New Orleans in 2011. The book's title comes from DJ Kool's 1996 hip-hop song.

Passarello's second collection, Animals Strike Curious Poses (Sarabande 2017), is a bestiary of famous animals. From Jeoffry the Cat to Koko the Gorilla to Dürer's Rhinoceros, these essays are as much about the animals as the humans who named and interact with them. The book's title comes from Prince's 1984 single "When Doves Cry." The book received favorable reviews from The New York Times, Publishers Weekly, Booklist, and The Guardian. It was listed as a New York Times Notable Book of 2017 and in The Guardian and Publishers Weekly's Best Books of 2017. In May 2018, it received the Oregon Book Award. The book has been translated into German, Italian, and Chinese.

Her essays have also appeared in several anthologies, including The Best American Science and Nature Writing, Pop When the World Falls Apart (Duke University Press), I'll Tell You Mine: Thirty Years of Essays from the Iowa Nonfiction Writing Program (University of Chicago Press), After Montaigne: Essayists Cover the Essays (University of Georgia Press), and How We Speak to One Another, Cat is Art Spelled Wrong, and Little Boxes: Twelve Writers on Television (all Coffee House Press). She co-edits the In Place Reading Series for West Virginia University Press and edits nonfiction for Iron Horse Literary Review at Texas Tech University.

Passarello also has credits as a performer, having originated roles in plays by David Turkel (Wild Signs, Holler) and Christopher Durang (Mrs. Bob Cratchit's Wild Christmas Binge), as well as several voice-over credits. She is currently an Associate Professor of Creative Writing in the MFA program at Oregon State University in Corvallis, Oregon.

Awards 
 2018 Oregon Book Award Winner
 2015 Whiting Award Winner
 2014 Oregon Book Award finalist
 2013 Gold Medal for Nonfiction, Independent Publisher Book Awards
 2011 Fellowship, Macdowell Colony
 2010 Fellowship, Hambidge Center

Bibliography

References 

Year of birth missing (living people)
Living people
Writers from Charleston, South Carolina
American women essayists
21st-century American essayists
Oregon State University faculty
University of Pittsburgh alumni
University of Iowa alumni
21st-century American women writers
American women academics